Richard Paul Milot (May 28, 1957 – August 13, 2021) was an American football linebacker in the National Football League who played his entire nine-year career with the Washington Redskins from 1979 to 1987. 

Milot played college football at Penn State University.  After two seasons playing as a backup running back, Milot was converted to linebacker, going on to intercept 3 passes in his final year with the Nittany Lions.  He was drafted in the seventh round of the 1979 NFL Draft.  During his nine NFL seasons, Milot intercepted 13 passes and returned them for 120 yards, while also recording 20.5 sacks and 5 fumble recoveries.  He won two Super Bowl rings with the Redskins, from Super Bowl XVII and Super Bowl XXII.

References

1957 births
2021 deaths
American football linebackers
Washington Redskins players
Penn State Nittany Lions football players
People from Coraopolis, Pennsylvania
Players of American football from Pennsylvania
Sportspeople from the Pittsburgh metropolitan area